Ras-related protein Rab-11A is a protein that in humans is encoded by the RAB11A gene.

Function 

The protein encoded by this gene belongs to the small GTPase superfamily, Rab family. It is associated with both constitutive and regulated secretory pathways, and may be involved in protein transport.

Rab-11a controls intracellular trafficking of the innate immune receptor TLR4, and thereby also receptor signaling

Interactions 

RAB11A has been shown to interact with:
 RAB11FIP1, 
 RAB11FIP2, 
 RAB11FIP3,
 RAB11FIP4,  and
 RAB11FIP5 
Moesin

References

Further reading